This is a list of countries by literacy rate.

The global literacy rate for all people aged 15 and above is 86.3%. The global literacy rate for all males is 90.0%, and the rate for all females is 82.7%. The rate varies throughout the world, with developed nations having a rate of 99.2% (2013), South and West Asia having 70.2% (2015), and sub-Saharan Africa at 64.0% (2015). Over 75% of the world's 781 million illiterate adults are found in South Asia, West Asia, and sub-Saharan Africa, and women represent almost two-thirds of all illiterate adults globally.

List of UN member states by age group and gender disparity 
Data published by UNESCO using the following definitions:Youth: Percentage of people aged 15 to 24 years who can both read and write with understanding a short simple statement on their everyday life. Generally, "literacy" also encompasses "numeracy", the ability to make simple arithmetic calculations.Adult: Percentage of the population aged 25 years and over who can both read and write, with understanding a short simple statement on his/her everyday life. Generally, "literacy" also encompasses "numeracy", the ability to make simple arithmetic calculations.Elderly: Percentage of the population aged 65 years and over who can both read and write, with understanding a short simple statement on their everyday life. Generally, "literacy" also encompasses "numeracy", the ability to make simple arithmetic calculations.Gender Parity Index (GPI): The gender parity index (GPI) of the youth literacy rate is the ratio of the female to male literacy rates of the population aged 15 to 24 years. A GPI value between 0.97 and 1.03 is usually interpreted to indicate gender parity.

* indicates "Literacy in COUNTRY or TERRITORY" or "Education in COUNTRY or TERRITORY" links.

List of UN member and observer states by adult literacy rate

* indicates "Literacy in COUNTRY or TERRITORY" or "Education in COUNTRY or TERRITORY" links.

List of other states and territories

See also
International Literacy Day
Compulsory education
List of Indian states and union territories by literacy rate
List of Brazilian states by literacy rate
Programme for International Student Assessment, which focuses on developed countries

Notes

References

External links
World Bank – Literacy rate, adult total (% of people ages 15 and above), for historical use.

Literacy

Literacy